Pillsbury Winthrop Shaw Pittman LLP, also known as Pillsbury, is a full-service law firm with a particular focus on the energy, financial services, real estate and technology industries. Based in the world's major financial, technology and energy centers, Pillsbury counsels clients on global business, regulatory and litigation matters.

It has approximately 700 attorneys operating from 20 offices in the U.S., London and Asia. The firm has connections to the two main political parties in the United States.

The law firm's two oldest predecessor firms were founded in New York in 1868 and in San Francisco in 1874, following the California Gold Rush. The San Francisco firm helped create a number of new West Coast businesses including Chevron and Pacific Bell (now known as AT&T). In the 2000s, Pillsbury has become an advocate of labor outsourcing as a means of firms cutting costs by offering services to both buyers and providers of outsourcing services.

History

Predecessor firm Pillsbury, Madison & Sutro opened in San Francisco in 1874, making Pillsbury the oldest "powerhouse" law firm in California. In 1900, Pillsbury incorporated Standard Oil of California—the company would later become Chevron, which has remained one of the firm's longstanding clients. Pillsbury managed Chevron's then-record $13.2 billion cash merger with Gulf Oil in 1984, its 2001 merger with Texaco and its 2005 acquisition of Unocal Corp.

Pillsbury is the result of several law firm mergers. In 1990, Pillsbury, Madison & Sutro merged with Los Angeles-based Lillick & McHose, and then in 1996 with Washington, D.C.-based Cushman Darby & Cushman. In 2001, the firm merged with Winthrop, Stimson, Putnam & Roberts of New York City (Winthrop Stimson's predecessor was founded in 1868 by future Secretary of State and Nobel Peace laureate Elihu Root; another past partner was statesman Henry L. Stimson). The firm changed its name to Pillsbury Winthrop.

In 2005 Pillsbury Winthrop merged with Shaw Pittman (formerly Shaw, Pittman, Potts & Trowbridge), a 300-lawyer Washington, D.C.-based firm working in global sourcing, energy, real estate, technology and communications.

Pillsbury was involved in the drafting of the 1952 Patent Act, which serves as the basis for patent law today, and launched the first nuclear energy law practice in the U.S. in 1966. In 1968, the firm handled the formation of Intel Corporation, and in 1970, it served as counsel on the first public offering by a member of the New York Stock Exchange. In 1980, Pillsbury advised on the then-largest foreign acquisition of a U.S. bank, and in 1994, the firm registered the first trademark for a dotcom.

In 2012, the firm entered into merger discussions with Washington, D.C.-based Dickstein Shapiro, but those talks ended by early 2013.

Offices
As of August 2022, Pillsbury has 20 offices in the US, China, Japan and the UK.

Notable work
Advised Israeli spyware firm NSO Group on "business development opportunities and strategies to educate potential business and government partners about NSO’s state-of-the-art technologies, including legal advice on U.S. government procurement regulations and corporate compliance policies." The firm has been implicated in several high profile scandals involving it's Pegasus software being deployed on journalists, activists, world leaders, and dissidents around the world.
Advised Genomic Health, Inc. in its $2.8 billion combination with Exact Sciences Corporation. The transaction will combine two leading cancer diagnostics companies.
Represented Joe Samuel Bailey and Laserscopic Spinal Centers of America Inc. in a theft-of-business trial resulting in disgorgement, compensatory and punitive damages and interest totaling over $370 million. The win dramatically increased the trial court’s original judgment of $1.6 million.
Represented WestJet as U.S. counsel in its US$3.7 billion acquisition by funds affiliated with Onex Corporation. Upon satisfaction of customary closing conditions, Onex will acquire a leading Canadian airline offering flights to more than 100 destinations throughout North America, Central America, the Caribbean, and Europe.
Represented Sinclair Broadcast Group, Inc. in its definitive agreement with The Walt Disney Company to acquire the equity interests in 21 Regional Sports Networks and Fox College Sports, which were acquired by Disney in its acquisition of Twenty-First Century Fox, Inc. The transaction brings a total enterprise value of the sports networks to $10.6 billion, reflecting a purchase price of $9.6 billion.
Represented Metso Corp. in an ICC-administered arbitration in which claimant ArcelorMittal, one of the largest vertically integrated steel manufacturers in the world, sought more than $200 million from Metso. The dispute centered on allegations that a Metso-supplied component relied upon in ArcelorMittal’s billion-dollar mining complex expansion in Mont-Wright, Quebec, Canada, was not fit for the purpose intended.
Represented JUUL Labs, Inc. in Altria Group, Inc.’s $12.8 billion investment. Altria’s investment represents a 35-percent economic interest in JUUL, valuing the company at $38 billion.
Advised NextEra Energy Transmission, LLC in a deal with SteelRiver Infrastructure Fund North America and its partners to acquire Trans Bay Cable, LLC for approximately $1 billion.
Worked with DV Leap, the Center for Judicial Excellence and the California Protective Parents Association to ensure the passage of H. Con. Res. 72, a bipartisan resolution urging state courts to determine family violence claims and risks to children before considering other ‘best interest’ factors.
Represented San Diego Comic-Con in trademark infringement dispute against the producers of “Salt Lake Comic Con.” San Diego Comic-Con was awarded $4 million in legal fees and obtained a permanent injunction on the use of the Comic Con trademark.
Represented ORIX Aviation in its agreement to purchase a 30-percent stake in Avolon Holdings Ltd. for $2.2 billion.
Advised Brookfield Business Partners L.P. on the regulatory and policy aspects of its successful acquisition of Westinghouse Electric Company. The purchase price for the global nuclear technology, services and fuel provider was $4.6 billion.
With Lambda Legal, represented pro bono client Drew Adams in the first transgender bathroom case ever to go to trial in the U.S. District Judge Timothy J. Corrigan of the United States District Court for the Middle District of Florida (Jacksonville Division) ruled in favor of Adams on all grounds on July 26, 2018.
Represented business process services company Synnex Corporation in its $2.43 billion cash-and-stock deal to acquire call center operator Convergys Corporation to expand its footprint in technology and information services.
Worked pro bono in conjunction with Columbia Law School's Sexuality and Gender Law Clinic to file an amicus brief in Karnoski v. Trump challenging the prohibition on military service by transgender people.
Worked pro bono on behalf of Human Rights Watch, Immigrant Legal Resource Center and Freedom for Immigrants, to file an amicus brief in a high-profile case addressing the “tragic state” of immigration detention centers in California.
Represented Cuker Interactive LLC in a trade secret dispute involving website development for Wal-Mart Stores Inc. An Arkansas jury found that Wal-Mart misappropriated trade secrets, awarding more than $12 million in damages.
Represented Japanese information and health technology giant Hoya Corp. in its investment in a consortium led by Boston’s Bain Capital to purchase Toshiba’s flash memory chip business. The $17.8 billion deal includes a 27 billion-yen commitment from Hoya Corp.
Served as co-counsel pro bono with the Disability Rights Legal Center, which settled two groundbreaking lawsuits relating to the rights of students with disabilities under the care of Pomona Unified School District. As a result, the district will undergo extensive remedial action, including hiring experts in special education to review and revise the district's policies, practices, and procedures.
Represented NTT Data Corp. in its acquisition of Dell Inc.'s IT services division (infrastructure services, cloud services, application services, and business process outsourcing) for $3 billion.
Worked pro bono with the ACLU of Northern California and Bay Area Legal Aid in a lawsuit challenging the suspension of driver's licenses as a means of collecting unpaid traffic fines. Under the terms of the settlement, the Court will notify every traffic defendant of their right to be heard regarding their “ability to pay.”
Advised Canadian developer in acquisition, financing and development of the world's largest retail, entertainment, amusement, recreation and tourism project, the $3.7 billion American Dream complex in New Jersey's Meadowlands.
Represented Fifth Street Properties in its approximately $2 billion purchase of 787 Seventh Avenue in New York City (and concurrent acquisition of $1 billion in financing for the property purchase).
Secured $71.7 million jury award for oil refinery company client, achieving full recovery against 14 insurers on a contingent business interruption claim resulting from a pipeline rupture.
Represented Media General Inc. in its successful $2.6 billion merger with LIN Media LLC, including the sale of seven television stations to various buyers to address regulatory and antitrust concerns.
 Represented the National Association of Regulatory Utility Commissioners (NARUC) in its D.C. appeals court win against the U.S. Department of Energy. The appeals court panel ordered the DOE to suspend $750 million a year in nuclear waste fees until it comes up with a permanent facility for depositing the waste.
 Represented Aerostar Airport Holdings in 2013 in arranging a $2.6 billion, 40-year deal creating that is the first public-private partnership for a major U.S. airport. Pillsbury helped the client obtain FAA and TSA approval to lease and operate Luis Muñoz Marín International Airport in San Juan, Puerto Rico.
 Represented Mitsui in its role as a minority partner with BP in the Deepwater Horizon drilling accident and oil spill.
Represented American Express in its defense against claims related to the Salad Oil Scandal.
 Represented Pacific Coast Hospitality in the $380 million sale of the Bacara resort in Santa Barbara, CA to the Ritz-Carlton Resort family of hotels in 2017.

Awards and recognition
Named to BTI’s 2019 Power Elite list; ranked No. 12 overall based on strength of client relationships.
In 2019, appeared for the 11th time on Working Mother’s list of the best law firms for women; selected for the publication’s inaugural Hall of Fame class.
In 2019, achieved a perfect score on the Human Rights Campaign’s Corporate Equality Index for the 13 consecutive years.
Named to the 2019 NAFE Top Companies for Executive Women list.
Ranked No. 61 by The American Lawyer in its 2019 AmLaw 100 ranking of law firms by gross revenue.
Recognized in 2018 by Financial Times Innovative Lawyers for helping clients access new markets with their work on the UAE and Turkey’s first nuclear power plant projects, and for the successful pro bono representation of a Florida transgender student in his fight to use the male bathrooms at his school. Pillsbury has been acknowledged by Financial Times for innovation every year since 2015.
Ranked No. 26 in LatinVex’s 2018 list of the top international law firms advising in Latin America.
In 2018, named to BTI Client Service Elite list for the 15th year in a row.
Received 2018 Richard W. Odgers Pro Bono Partner Award from the Giffords Law Center to Prevent Gun Violence. The award recognized Pillsbury's litigation effort to compel the Department of Defense to improve reporting to the federal background checks system following the mass shooting in Sutherland Springs, Texas.
Named a Top 10 Family-Friendly Firm by Yale Law Women in 2018.
Named a 2017 Law Firm of the Year by Chambers Women in Law in the category of Furthering Women's Careers.
BTI Consulting Group has named Pillsbury as one of the 25 "Most Recommended Law Firms among GCs" for more than five years in a row.

Layoffs
In April 2006, Pillsbury had a round of layoffs. These layoffs were in connection with the merger with Shaw Pitman in April 2005.  The layoffs included its unofficial mascot, Martin Macy.  Macy, who had started with the firm at the age 17, had been in the San Francisco office for 41 years prior to his dismissal. He was terminated from his position as messenger to save his annual salary of $34,000.  At the time, the combined revenue for the partners at the firm had dropped from $780,000 to $760,000  and the firm's assets were over $6 million. To assist Macy, the legal community created a trust fund to which former co-workers, clients and other members of the legal community donated money.  The San Francisco Chronicle reported that "His dismissal has become something of a cause celebre in the San Francisco legal community." By April 2007, over $230,000 had been gathered for Macy. Macy died in his sleep on February 2008.

Misconduct
In 2009 a United States federal judge found misconduct by a number of lawyers regarding the conflict of interest disclosure failures by Pillsbury Winthrop in the SONICblue bankruptcy case stating "The reorganization of SONICblue, Inc. has been tragically marred by the misdeeds of professionals". Pillsbury was forced to disgorge $10 million in fees for filing a false affidavit and hiding their conflict of interest for the debtor in the bankruptcy case of SONICblue.  The federal judge ordered the firm to step down citing the "complete breakdown of creditor confidence" due to the firm's failure to make a required disclosure of a conflict of interest involving a number of hedge funds. Counsel for the official creditors committee gave tacit approval of the conflict as neither law firm brought the matter to the attention of the court. Sequential conflict disclosure misconduct in the SONICblue bankruptcy case has escalated the possible consequences to Pillsbury. The lawyer representing the successor to SONICblue subsequently learned that in addition to the failure to disclose the conflict, the firm also failed to disclose their own withdrawal of funds from the Debtor during the pre-petition preference period and had petitioned the Federal Judge to refer the firm's responsible lawyers for criminal prosecution and sought $30 million in damages from Pillsbury Winthrop and associated parties on the official creditors committee as well as their counsel.

On March 29, 2018, Pillsbury Winthrop was disqualified from representing a client, Continental Service Group Inc. who collects overdue student loans.  A partner had said about a competitor (Performant Financial Corp.) that it "was not a highly rated" company. However, Performant  was a current client of Pillsbury Winthrop in other matters.  The judge stated that the Pillsbury Winthrop's partners' statements  "created a situation where he has stunted Pillsbury's ability to effectively and zealously advocate on ConServe's behalf." Pillsbury denied any wrongdoing.

References

Further reading

External links
 

Law firms established in 1868
Law firms based in New York City
Outsourcing in the United States
Foreign law firms with offices in Japan
1868 establishments in New York (state)